Moshe Bar is a neuroscientist, director of the Gonda Multidisciplinary Brain Research Center at Bar-Ilan University. He is the head of the Cognitive Neuroscience Laboratory at the Gonda Multidisciplinary Brain Research Center. Prof. Bar assumed the position of the Gonda Multidisciplinary Brain Research Center director following 17 years in the US, where he had served as an associate professor at Harvard University and Massachusetts General Hospital last, and had led the Cognitive Neuroscience Laboratory at the Athinoula A. Martinos Center for Biomedical Imaging.

Prof. Bar has made significant contributions to the field of cognition; ideas and findings that have challenged dominant paradigms in areas of exceptional diversity: from the flow of information in the cortex during visual recognition to the importance of mental simulations for planning and foresight in the brain, and from the effect of form on aesthetic preferences to a clinical theory on mood and depression. Bar uses methods from cognitive psychology, psychophysics, human brain imaging, computational neuroscience, and psychiatry to explore predictions and contextual processing in the brain, and their role in facilitating visual recognition.

Professional history

Bar graduated from Ben-Gurion University in Israel in 1988 with a Bachelor of Science in Biomedical Engineering.  After graduating from University, Bar spent the next six years as a member of Israeli Air Force, during which time he began his Masters work in Computer Science at the Weizmann Institute of Science.  After completing his Masters education in 1994, he entered a PhD program in Cognitive Neuroscience at the University of Southern California, where he was awarded the Psychology department’s ‘Outstanding Doctoral Thesis' Award. His dissertation investigated priming effects elicited by subliminal visual stimuli. Bar subsequently completed a postdoctoral fellowship at Harvard University before receiving his appointments at Harvard Medical School and Massachusetts General Hospital. In 2011, he assumed directorship of the Gonda Multidisciplinary Brain Research Center at Bar-Ilan University.

Research and scientific contributions 

Using behavioral paradigms and neuroimaging technologies including functional magnetic resonance imaging (fMRI) and magnetoencephalography (MEG), Bar investigates how the brain extracts and uses contextual information to generate predictions and guide cognition efficiently. His work has concentrated on questions spanning: predictive systems in the brain, the flow of information in the cortex during visual recognition, the cortical processes that underlie conscious perception (i.e., visual awareness), contextual associative processing of scene information, the cortical mechanisms mediating the formation of first impressions, visual elements that determine human preference and understanding the cognitive mechanisms underlying mood disorders. His research has influenced a diverse spectrum of domains. A partial list is provided below.

1.   Visual recognition – Branching off of his solid graduate training (with Professors Ullman and Biederman), Prof. Bar has been using behavioral and neuroimaging (fMRI and MEG) methods to reveal critical aspects of how the brain recognizes objects, scenes and context in the world around us.  This research simultaneously challenged two long-held views.  First, together with others, he has argued and shown convincingly that the propagation of visual analysis in the cortex is not strictly “bottom-up,” as has been believed for decades, but rather that perception is a result of internally driven top-down processes as much as it is of incoming bottom-up sensory information.  As such, his work shows that memory and the prefrontal cortex are active players in visual perception. Since Prof. Bar first proposed this notion in a Journal of Cognitive Neuroscience article (2003), and then in a Proceedings of the National Academy of Sciences paper (2006) that has been exceptionally influential, it has become the mainstream view of how the brain processes visual information.  

A second debate and new domain of research that was steered by Prof. Bar’s ideas and studies involves the evasive distinction between spatial (e.g., locations, positions, navigation) and associative (i.e., what comes with what) processing.  Part of the seminal contribution of his research was to characterize the cortical network that mediates processing of contextual associations (e.g., the associations between all the objects that one typically expects to find in a kitchen), introduced broadly in a Nature Reviews Neuroscience (2004) paper.  This newly discovered network included a site in the medial temporal cortex that has traditionally been considered as a site that mediates the representation and processing of spatial information.  His findings offer a challenging interpretation for those previous reports, suggesting that the role of this hippocampal region should more generally be described as mediating associative information rather than exclusively space-related information.

2.   Predictions in brain – Following his research on the role of associations in cognition, Prof. Bar has pioneered (together with a few other groups) a major new research wave indicating that the brain is a predictive and proactive organ.  His theoretical and empirical work has set in motion a collection of hypotheses and studies about how, where and why the brain uses the past (memory) to generate a future (predictions).  Having been one of the early leaders in this direction, Prof. Bar also integrated the various views on predictions in a special issue of the Proceedings of the Royal Society (2009), and then expanded in a book by Oxford Press (2011), as well as organized a couple of the kick-off symposia on the topic.  The work of Prof. Bar provides foundations with which to understand planning and decision-making in the human mind. This work was covered by international media extensively (https://faculty.biu.ac.il/~barlab/media.html), which is not surprising given how much of our time, and of our cortex, is dedicated to our inner mental world and its service to our actions, perceptions and interactions.

3.   Mental simulations and the function of mindwandering – Prof. Bar’s research also explains the intensity and usefulness of humans’ proclivity for mental simulations and mindwandering. As the philosopher Karl Popper famously said, we let our hypotheses die in our stead. The work of Prof. Bar supported and developed this assertion by showing that humans use their experience, as stored in memory, to simulate new, imagined, experiences. These simulations are stored as ‘memories’ and later can be used as predictive scripts that guide our cognition, decisions and action.  They have links to the brain’s ‘default network’.

4.   Mood and depression – Several years ago, Prof. Bar’s research evolved to include clinical questions, particularly pertaining to psychiatric disorders such as major depression, and this work made a rapid impact.  He started with a theoretical paper (Trends in Cognitive Sciences, 2009) that presented a novel synthesis of findings from psychiatry, neuroscience and cognitive psychology, which gave rise to an overarching hypothesis linking mood with thinking patterns and associative processing.  The crux of his groundbreaking hypothesis is that a thinking pattern that involves a broad associative scope elicits positive mood, while a ruminative thinking pattern and inhibition trigger negative mood. Through extensive and fruitful collaborations first with the outstanding department of psychiatry at the Harvard medical school and the Massachusetts General Hospital, and since his return with multiple psychiatric institutions in Israel, this theory has been tested, supported and polished to a point where it is now being implemented in a therapeutic tool soon to become available to all.  The theory connects the semantic scope of mental processes to neurogenesis in the hippocampus (which is admittedly a big leap but with promise), the regulation of inhibition from the prefrontal cortex, and mood. The behavioral and neuroimaging publications that stemmed from these ideas already attracted exceptional levels of attention with their global explanatory power and their potential for therapeutic alleviation of symptoms.  Prof. Bar’s approach, now being employed in healthy and clinical populations, is to train participants with broad associative thinking in a way that will restore their deficient medial-frontal cortical network and critically diminish ruminative thinking.  Rumination is a hallmark of not only major depression but also of other debilitating disorders such as addiction, OCD, PTSD, eating disorders, and more. Therefore, this approach, which already shows significant positive outcomes in pilot participants with major depression, has the potential of helping multiple clinical populations. 

5.   Aesthetic preference – Through collaborations with artists, architects and public health professionals, Prof. Bar’s influence is also visible in less expected domains. His research on the design of streets, for example, has led to criteria for streetscapes that promote increased physical activity. Prof. Bar’s work on the effect of contour (e.g., smooth vs. sharp) on subjective preference and emotion, in particular, has had an influence on designers, advertisers and architects alike (from the famous architect Frank Gehry to the magazine Cosmopolitan). His collaboration with the school of architecture at the Technion, which started at and still includes also Harvard’s school of design (GSD), examines the influence of different spaces on affect and on human functionality. And in collaborations that include the HIT (Holon Institute of Technology) and independent architects he now examines the optimization of space-shape to function (e.g., waiting room in hospitals, schools, playgrounds), as well as what are the visual design elements that best stimulate curiosity.

Representative publications

 Baror S., Bar M. (2016). Associative Activation and Its Relation to Exploration and Exploitation in the Brain. Psychological Science, epub ahead of print
 Axelrod V., Rees G., Lavidor M., Bar M. (2015). Increasing propensity to mind-wander with transcranial direct current stimulation. Proceedings of the National Academy of Sciences, 112(11):3314-9.
 Aminoff, E.M., Kveraga, K., and Bar, M. (2013). The role of parahippocampal cortex in cognition. Trends in Cognitive Science, 17(8):379-90.
 Bar, M.  (Ed.) (2011). Predictions in the Brain: Using Our Past to Generate a Future. Oxford: Oxford University Press.
 Bar, M.  (2009). A cognitive neuroscience hypothesis of mood and depression. Trends in Cognitive Sciences, 13(11), 456-463.
 Kveraga, K.,  Boshyan, J.  and Bar, M.  (2007). Magnocellular projections as the trigger of top-down facilitation in recognition. Journal of Neuroscience, 27, 13232-13240.
 Bar, M.  (2007). The Proactive Brain: Using analogies and associations to generate predictions. Trends in Cognitive Sciences, 11(7), 280-289.
 Bar, M., Kassam, K., Ghuman, A., Boshyan, J., Dale, A., Hämäläinen, M., Marinkovic, K., Schacter, D.L., Rosen, B., and Halgren, E. (2006). Top-down facilitation of visual recognition. Proceedings of the National Academy of Sciences, 103(2), 449-54.
 Bar, M.  (2004). Visual objects in context. Nature Reviews: Neuroscience, 5, 617-629.
 Bar, M.  (2003). A cortical mechanism for triggering top-down facilitation in visual object recognition. Journal of Cognitive Neuroscience, 15, 600-609.
 Bar, M.  and Aminoff, E.  (2003). Cortical analysis of visual context. Neuron, 38, 347-358.

Books and book chapters (selected) 

 Kveraga, K. and Bar, M., (Eds.) (2014). SCENE VISION Making Sense of What We See. Cambridge, Mass.: The MIT Press.
 Bar, M. and Bubic, A. (2013). Top-down Effects in Visual Perception. In Ochsner K. and Kosslyn S., (Eds) The Oxford Handbook of Cognitive Neuroscience (pp. 60–73). The Oxford Handbook Series, Oxford University Press.
 Bar, M., (Ed.) (2011). Predictions in the Brain. New York: Oxford University Press Inc.
 Bar, M. (2011). Predictions: A universal principle in the operation of the human brain (Introduction). In Bar, M., (Ed.) Predictions in the Brain. (pp. v-vii). New York: Oxford University Press Inc.
 Bar, M. (2011). The proactive brain. In Bar, M., (Ed.) Predictions in the Brain. (pp. 13–26). New York: Oxford University Press Inc.
 Barrett, L.F., and Bar, M. (2011). See it with feeling: Affective predictions during object perception. In Bar, M., (Ed.) Predictions in the Brain. (pp. 107–121). New York: Oxford University Press Inc.
 Bar, M. (2005). Top-down facilitation of visual object recognition. In Itti, L., Rees, G., Tsotsos, J., (Eds.) Neurobiology of Attention (pp. 140–5). Burlington, MA: Elsevier Academic Press.

Recent popular press coverage
Think Less, Think Better. The New York Times, June 2016
A manifesto for conscious cities: should streets be sensitive to our mental needs? The Guardian, August 2015
The Benefits of Mind-Wandering. The Wall Street Journal, June 2015
Use your delusion. Boston Globe, February 2014
Why being anxious will help you cope with life. Haaretz, June 2013
Do Thrifty Brains Make Better Minds? N.Y. Times, January 2012
Why New Year's resolutions are so hard to keep. Boston Globe, January 2012
Mind Games: Modern design memes touch our brains, but do we want to know how? Frame, September/October 2011
Human Memory: What did you do last Sunday? L.A. Times, May 2011
Pie in the Sky: Broad Thinking Brings Broad Grins. Psychology Today, April 2010
What do you see? Emotion may help the visual system jump the gun to predict what the brain will see. Science News Magazine, August 2009
How Room Designs Affect Your Work and Mood. Scientific American, April 2009
Nuts & Bolts - Research: Neuromarketing and the consumer brain. Target Marketing, November 1, 2008
The children of Boomers are legion, and they are making their own mark. Media Magazine, January 2008

References

External links
Publications
 Bar-Ilan University Lab

American neuroscientists
Academic staff of Bar-Ilan University
Israeli neuroscientists
Living people
Year of birth missing (living people)